Vaidhegi Kaathirundhaal is a 2021 Indian-Tamil language family dramatic television series, starring Sharanya Turadi Sundaraj and Munna, that was premiered on 20 December 2021, and airs on Star Vijay and is also available on the digital platform Disney+ Hotstar before it's telecast.This serial abruptly stopped, the last episode telecasted was on 4 February 2022.

Plot
Amuthanayaki is a kind woman who lives happily with her daughter. However, their world crumbles when her granddaughter goes missing in the village fair. A few years later, Vaidhehi's mother passes away and she is left with her son Anand.

Vaidehi is now grown up and is called Poornima.  She makes a living by offering false witness accounts in the high court premises.

In a quirk of fate Poornima is asked to impersonate Vaidehi and inherit Amuthanayaki's wealth by her relatives.

When Poornima reaches the house she slowly begins to remember her past and realises that she is the real Vaidehi. How she gets out of this mess and permanently reunites with her grandmother forms the rest of the story.

Cast

Main cast
 Sharanya Turadi Sundaraj as Vaidehi a.k.a. Poornima (2021-2022)
 She is the missing grand-daughter of Ammuthanayaki
  Prajin Padmanadhan (2021-2022) / Munaf "Munna" Rahman as Vijay Rajarathinam (2022)
 He is Vaidehi's cousin and a generous guy

Supporting roles
 Latha as Amuthanayaki, Vijay's Grandmother (2021-2022)
Anitha Venkat as Akhilandeshwari Rajarathinam, Vijay's Mother  (2021-2022)
Usha Elizabeth Suraj as Kaveri Subburatnam, Amuthanayagi 2nd Daughter in Law (2021-2022)
Nirosha as Amrutha Kanagarathnam, Amuthanayagi 3rd Daughter in Law (2021-2022)
Manush Manmohan as Lawyer Kanagarathnam, Amrutha Husband (2021-2022)
Vignesh as Rajarathinam, Vijay's Father (2021-2022)
Pondy Ravi as Subburathnam, Kaveri's Husband
Bavithra as Aarathi, Kaveri's Niece (2021-2022)
Yogesh Venugopal as Mahesh, Vijay and Vaidehi's cousin (2021-2022)
Baboos Kaliappan as Poornima's adopted father (2021-2022)
Stefy Remigus as Poornima's Friend
Sathya Raja as Kannan, Poornima's Friend

Cameo appearances 
Tarun Yuvraaj as Young Vijay 
Yamuna Chinnadurai as Valliamma, Vaidehi's mother (Died in serial) 
Gowthami Vembunathan as Poornima's adopted mother (Photographic appearance only)

References

Star Vijay original programming
2020s Tamil-language television series
Tamil-language romance television series
2021 Tamil-language television series debuts
Tamil-language television shows
2022 Tamil-language television series endings